The 54th Pennsylvania House of Representatives District in southeast Pennsylvania has been represented by Greg Scott since 2023.

District profile
The 54th District was previously located in Allegheny County and Westmoreland County.
Following  2022 redistricting, the District is located in Montgomery County and includes the following areas:

Conshohocken
Norristown
 Plymouth Township

Representatives

References

Government of Allegheny County, Pennsylvania
Government of Westmoreland County, Pennsylvania
54